Calixto Álvarez (Santa Isabel de las Lajas, Cuba, 1938) is a Cuban composer.

Academic background
Calixto Álvarez was born on March 15, 1938, in Santa Isabel de las Lajas, Cienfuegos, Cuba, and began to play musical instruments when he was just five years old. Álvarez studied at the Santa Clara Conservatory and the National Conservatory of Havana. In 1958 he travelled to the United States, where he studied piano, organ and composition until 1966 at the Julius Hartt College of Music. At a later time, in 1967, he went to Poland where he studied at the Warsaw Superior School of Music with Andrzej Dobrowolsky, Włodzimierz Kotoński and other professors. Upon his return to Cuba he received instruction from Leo Brouwer, José Ardévol and Federico Smith

Professional activity
Calixto Álvarez has composed music for diverse instruments and for instrumental and choral groups. He has excelled as incidental music composer for numerous theatre plays such as "Las impuras" and "La duodécima noche", presented by Teatro Estudio, as well as for "La dolorosa historia del amor secreto de don José Jacinto Milanés" (1974), from Abelardo Estorino. Álvarez has also composed several comedies, such as "Los musiquillos de Bremen" based on a story from Julio Babrusquinas, "Lisístrata", "Venus y Adonis" (an electroacoustic opera which consists on the adaptation of the homonim poem from William Shakespeare by Armando Suárez del Villar), he has also conducted the "Cantoría Infantil del Teatro Lírico Nacional de Cuba", for which he produced several musical comedies such as "Las aceitunas", "Siempre caperucita" and "El flautista de Hamelín".
Calixto Álvarez has worked as advisor for CMBF Radio Station in Havana.

Works
 Sonatina
 Quinteto de viento
 Trío opus 13 No. 72 
 Tema y seis variaciones para piano (1967) 
 Torus para contrabajo (1969) 
 Poker para cuarteto de cuerdas (1970)
 Canon II para piano y banda magnetofónica (1981)
 Cuento electrónico para medios electroacústicos (1982)
 Canto Cardinal para contralto, percusión y piano 
 Stripofumios y varsiflorios para orquesta

Awards
Calixto Álvarez received the Alejo Carpentier Medal from the Cuban government for his contributions to Cuban culture in 2002.

See also 
 Music of Cuba

References

External links
 Requiem Osun de Calixto Álvarez – versión completa: https://www.youtube.com/watch?v=6AknkHByMPQ

1938 births
20th-century classical composers
20th-century male musicians
Cuban classical composers
Cuban composers
Male composers
Latin music composers
Living people
Male classical composers
People from Havana
Cuban expatriates in the United States
Cuban expatriates in Poland
Cuban male musicians